The 1989–90 Coppin State Eagles men's basketball team represented Coppin State University during the 1989–90 NCAA Division I men's basketball season. The Eagles, led by 4th year head coach Fang Mitchell, played their home games at the Coppin Center and were members of the Mid-Eastern Athletic Conference. They finished the season 26–7, 15–1 in MEAC play to win the conference regular season title. The Eagles then went on to win the MEAC tournament title to receive an automatic bid to the NCAA tournament – the first in school history – as No. 15 seed in the Southeast region. Coppin State lost in the first round to No. 2 seed Syracuse, 70–48.

Roster

Schedule

|-
!colspan=9 style=| Regular season

|-
!colspan=9 style=| MEAC tournament

|-
!colspan=9 style=| NCAA tournament

References

1989-90
1989–90 Mid-Eastern Athletic Conference men's basketball season
1990 NCAA Division I men's basketball tournament participants
1989 in sports in Maryland
1990 in sports in Maryland